Epiblema similana is a moth belonging to the family Tortricidae. The species was first described by Michael Denis and Ignaz Schiffermüller in 1775.

It is native to Europe.

References

Eucosmini
Moths described in 1775